Yellowstone National Park (part) was a former county-equivalent in southwestern Montana, a state in the northwestern United States.

Geography
In 1872, Yellowstone National Park became the first national park in the United States and widely considered the first national park in the world.

In 1887, the portion of Yellowstone National Park in Montana was excluded from the jurisdiction of Park County and Gallatin County. Thus, it became a non-county area. Its boundaries were the same as the Montana section of Yellowstone National Park, which is primarily within Wyoming. In 1929, the non-county area expanded to reflect Yellowstone's extended boundaries in Montana. In 1932, the non-county area expanded once again to include Yellowstone's annexation of the Game Ranch in what is now Park County.

On November 7, 1978, voters in Park County and Gallatin County approved the area's dissolution into the two original counties.

Census data
The United States Census Bureau did not adjust for the county-equivalent's dissolution until 1997, 19 years after the reapportionment into two counties.  The transferred areas were then designated by the Census Bureau as Census Tract 14 in Gallatin County, and Census Tract 6 in Park County. The designations did not change the area's status as part of Yellowstone National Park.

In the 1990 census, the last one before the Census Bureau reapportionment, the county-equivalent had a population of 52 persons. In the 2000 census, the combined population of Tracts 6 and 14 had grown to 61 persons.

See also

References

Montana counties
Geography of Gallatin County, Montana
Geography of Park County, Montana
Yellowstone National Park
1978 disestablishments in Montana
Montana articles lacking sources